The Sinyaya (Siine) is a river in the Sakha Republic, Russia. It is a left tributary of the Lena.

Course
It flows roughly southeastwards and there are about 3,300 lakes in its basin. In its lower course the river is flanked by picturesque rock formations, the Sinyaya Pillars.

The Sinyaya freezes between October and May. From the end of May to June it flows at a high level owing to the melting of snow and the flow recedes in the summer. The area of the river basin is largely uninhabited. The river flows across three districts, Verkhnevilyuy, Gorny and Khangalassky.

The main tributaries of the Sinyaya are the Khangdaryma, Appaya and Chyna on the right and the Matta, Mekele, Chyra and Nuoraldyma on the left.

See also
List of rivers of Russia

References

External links

 Geography - Yakutia Organized
Rivers of the Sakha Republic